Fravashi is the Avestan language term for the Zoroastrian concept of a personal spirit of an individual, whether dead, living, or yet-unborn. The fravashi of an individual sends out the urvan (often translated as 'soul') into the material world to fight the battle of good versus evil. On the morning of the fourth day after death, the urvan is imagined to return to its fravashi, where its experiences in the material world are collected to assist the next generation in their fight between good and evil.

The first month of the year as well as the 19th day of each month are considered under the protection of, and named after, the fravashis.

Etymology
The word  is commonly perceived to have var- "to choose," as its root. From reconstructed  (/rt/ clusters in Avestan usually appear as /š/),  could then mean "one who has been selected (for exaltation)." The same root, in the sense of "to choose/profess a faith," is found in the word , the name of the Zoroastrian credo.

Other interpretations take other meanings of var- into consideration: Either as var- "to cover" that in a bahuvrihi with fra- "to ward" provides "protective valor," or a derivation from var- "to make/be pregnant" which gives "promoter of birth, birth-spirit." One interpretation considers a derivation from vart- "turn" hence "turning away, departing, death." The Epistles of Zadspram, a 10th century exegetical work, derives fravashi from fra-vaxsh "to grow forth."

In scripture
Like most other Zoroastrian yazatas, the fravashis are not mentioned in the Gathas. The earliest mention of them is in the Old Avestan Yasna Haptanghaiti (Y. 37) which includes an invocation of "the fravashis of the righteous" (ashavan). In chapter 57 of the Yasna, the fravashis are responsible for the course of the sun, moon, and stars (and will do so until the renovation of this world), and in nurturing waters and plants, and protecting the unborn in the womb.

Yasht 13 is one of the eight "great" yashts, and at 158 verses the longest text in the collection, and one of the better preserved ones as well. It is also the second-most frequently recited Yasht (after Yasht 1 to Mazda). Several different authors contributed to the hymn, and its literary quality is uneven; while some verses are rich in traditional poetic phrases, others are of dully imitative prose. The frequently repeated kshnuman (formulaic invocation) of Yasht 13 is "We worship the good, strong, bounteous fravašis of the righteous (ashavan)."

Yasht 13 begins with a cosmogonical chapter in which the Creator Ahura Mazda is portrayed as acknowledging that material creation was brought about with the assistance of "many hundreds, many thousands, many tens of thousands" of "mighty, victorious fravashis" (13.1-2). Moreover, Mazda is presented as acknowledging that without the help of the fravashis, cattle and men would have been lost to Angra Mainyu. "This declaration is wholly unorthodox, and unsupported by any other text." Verses 14-15, as also several other verses scattered through the text, describe how the fravashis continue to sustain the material world and mankind in the post-creation phase of the world. Verses 16-17, as also several other later verses, celebrate their military prowess and assistance in battle, where they are invoked. Verse 20 includes an injunction to memorize their invocation, so as to be able to call on them in times of need.

In 13.49-52, the hymn turns to the function of the fravashis in relation to the dead. There, the fravashis of the dead are said to return to their (former) homes during the last days of the year (Hamaspathmaedaya, frawardigan), hoping to be worshipped and receive gifts, in exchange for which they bless those who live there. This section (karda), known to priests by its opening words as the ya visatha, also appears in Siroza 1/2 and several Afrinagans, notably those of Arda Fravash (the 'righteous fravash') and Dahman (the yazata of prayer), and is thus a frequently recited passage. And while they are said to have martial prowess in some passages, elsewhere (13.49-52, 13.96-144), they are co-eval with the relatively helpless urvan. This co-identification also occurs elsewhere in the Avesta, such as in Yasna 16.7, where it is explicit.

According to Mary Boyce, the perplexing anomalies of Yasht 13 are residual traces of fravashi cult, which she defines as a form of an ancestor worship and/or hero-cult that developed during (what she calls) the 'Iranian Heroic Age' (c. 1500 BCE onwards).

In tradition

Although there is no physical description of a fravashi in the Avesta, the faravahar, one of the best known symbols of Zoroastrianism, is commonly believed to be the depiction of one. The attribution of the name (which derives from the Middle Iranian word for fravashi) to the symbol is probably a later development. In Avestan language grammar, the fravashi are unmistakably female, while the faravahar symbol is unmistakably male.

In the Denkard's myth of Zoroaster's conception (Dk., 7.2.15-47), his frawahr is sent down from heaven within a unique hom-plant to be united on earth with his mortal body (tanu) and appointed glory (xwarrah). In the Bundahishn's creation myth narrates a fable in which the fravashis are given a choice of either remaining protected with Ahura Mazda, or being born into mortals, suffering but also helping bring about the defeat of Angra Mainyu. The fravashis are shown the future before the creation of the getik material world. Ohrmazd's offer of security with inaction is rejected and the fravashi consent to enter the material world as active allies in the battle against evil (GBd. 34.12f). In another cosmological myth (Zadspram 3.2-3), when Angra Mainyu breaks into the created world, the fravashis draw together on the rim of the sky to imprison him.

In the hierarchy of the yazatas, the fravashis are the assistants of the Amesha Spenta Haurvatat (Middle Persian: Khordad) of "Wholeness", whose special domain are "the Waters" (Avestan Apo, Middle Persian: Aban).

In the day-name dedications of the Zoroastrian calendar, the fravashis preside over the 19th day of the month and the first month of the year, and both are named after the frawards. The intersection of the month-name and day-name dedications are the name-day feast of the frawards. This feast day of farvardin jashan is especially observed by Zoroastrians who have lost a relative in the preceding year. Additionally, the fourth watch (gah) of the twenty-four-hour day, from sunset to midnight, is under the protection of the frawards.

References
Citations

Works cited

 .
 
 .
 
 

Yazatas
Ancient Iranian legendary creatures
de:Fravashi